Zdenka Hásková (1878 - 1946) was a Czech translator, journalist and writer.

Life
Zdenka Hásková was born on 28 May 1878. Hásková's novel Mládí (1909) looked at the love lives of educated young women, and their sensation of youth passing. Her poems, collected in Cestou (1920), paid attention to everyday life with a confessional immediacy.

In 1928 she married the writer and right-wing politician Viktor Dyk, who died in 1931. She died 7 November 1946.

Works
 Mládí [Youth], 1909
 Cestou [On the Way], 1920

References

1878 births
1946 deaths
Czech translators
20th-century Czech writers
20th-century Czech women writers
Czech journalists
Czech women journalists
Austro-Hungarian writers